is a run and gun video game for the Neo-Geo created by SNK Playmore. It was released in 2003 for the MVS arcade platform and is the fifth game in the Metal Slug series. The game was developed by Noise Factory/SNK Playmore, after Korean company Mega Enterprise had directed Metal Slug 4. It was the last Metal Slug released on the Neo Geo.

It was later ported to Microsoft Xbox and PlayStation 2 as a stand-alone game, and along with Metal Slug 4 as a compilation in North America and South Korea. It was ported to Microsoft Windows for a Korean release. A port was also released on Nintendo Switch in 2018.

Plot

One year after the events of Metal Slug 4, a special disc that contains deep and intricate secrets about the Metal Slug project is stolen by a mysterious group called the Ptolemaic Army, whose specialty lies from within archaeological excavation and espionage. Marco and Tarma of the Peregrine Falcon Strike Force follow in hot pursuit against the group and in the process are joined by Eri and Fio of SPARROWS. Together once more, the quartet investigate the shrouded objective of the Ptolemaic Army, who over time grows more powerful as they are joined by a mysterious masked man and his followers. At the end of the game, the Ptolemaic Army summons a giant demon as the final boss, which after a long battle is forced to leave Earth thanks to the heroes.

Reception

Metal Slug 5 received mixed to positive reviews from critics. It received very positive scores from players, with an average of 8.1 on GameSpot for the PS2 version and 8.4 for the Arcade version.

Notes

References

External links 
 
 Metal Slug 5 at GameFAQs
 Metal Slug 5 at Giant Bomb
 Metal Slug 5 at Killer List of Videogames
 Metal Slug 5 at MobyGames

2003 video games
ACA Neo Geo games
Arcade video games
Cooperative video games
Metal Slug
Multiplayer and single-player video games
Nintendo Switch games
Neo Geo games
PlayStation 2 games
PlayStation Network games
PlayStation 4 games
SNK Playmore games
Video game sequels
Video games developed in Japan
Video games featuring female protagonists
Video games set in Brazil
Video games set in Osaka
Windows games
Xbox games
Xbox One games
UTV Ignition Games games
Hamster Corporation games